The men's high jump event at the 1989 Summer Universiade was held at the Wedaustadion in Duisburg on 29 and 30 August 1989.

Medalists

Results

Qualification

Final
Held on 30 August

References

Athletics at the 1989 Summer Universiade
1989